Dana Berliner is Litigation Director at the Institute for Justice, a public interest law firm in Arlington, Virginia founded in 1991 by Chip Mellor and Clint Bolick. She was co-lead counsel for Susette Kelo in the landmark United States Supreme Court case Kelo v. City of New London.

Berliner received her law and undergraduate degrees from Yale University, where she was a member of the Yale Law Journal and represented clients through the legal services program. After law school, she clerked for Judge Jerry Edwin Smith on the United States Court of Appeals for the Fifth Circuit.

Berliner has distinguished herself through her work in the area of eminent domain. Along with co-counsel Scott Bullock, Berliner litigated the landmark case Kelo v. City of New London. More recently, Berliner acted as lead counsel for Bill Brody in the New York eminent domain case Brody v. Village of Port Chester". In 2015, Berliner represented the Community Youth and Athletic Center, a non-profit boxing gym for children in National City, California, defending it from potential eminent domain use by the city.

In addition to her work in the courtroom, Berliner has authored two works concerning eminent domain and been involved with the issue in other ways. In 2003, she wrote Public Power, Private Gain: A Five-Year, State-by-State Report Examining the Abuse of Eminent Domain. She also authored Opening the Floodgates: Eminent Domain Abuse in the Post-Kelo World'', a report published by the Castle Coalition on the use and threatened use of eminent domain for private development in the year since the Kelo decision. Berliner has also written amicus curiae briefs on constitutional eminent domain issues in more than ten states. Over the past few years, she has also taught many continuing legal education classes on public use. She works with owners around the country in opposing the condemnation of their homes and businesses for private use.

References

External links 

 Dana Berliner's Institute for Justice profile page
 Public Power Private Gain: A Five-Year State By State Report Examining the Abuses of Eminent Domain Published April 2003
 Article written by Dana Berliner and Scott Bullock published by the Heartland Institute: End Eminent Domain Abuse

Living people
Yale Law School alumni
Year of birth missing (living people)
Virginia lawyers
American women lawyers
American lawyers
21st-century American women